The Blunts Point Battery, also known as Blunts Point Naval Gun or Matautu Ridge Gun Site, is a gun battery on Matautu Ridge near Pago Pago, American Samoa.  It was part of the fortification of the Samoan Islands which took place after the attack on Pearl Harbor, and is a rare example of a World War II Pacific coastal gun which remains in relatively pristine condition.  It was declared a National Historic Landmark in 1987.

On August 28, 1941, the two guns shot sixteen rounds at a target floating in Pago Pago Harbor. The guns’ discharge could be heard for miles away. Approximately one week after the guns were tested, ten rounds were shot from each of the two recently-placed guns at Breakers Point.

Description and history

Blunts Point is a projection on the west side of the mouth of Pago Pago Harbor, on the south side of the island of Tutuila, southeast of the village of Utulei. A short way below the emplacement is a magazine which is built into the hillside. The battery has recently been restored and is in good condition. It is accessible to the public via a moderately difficult hiking trail.

The tensions of World War II prompted the United States government to begin fortifying American Samoa in 1940.  United States Marines installed the two guns at Blunts Point, and another two on the east side of the harbor at Breakers Point.  Following the Japanese attack on Pearl Harbor in December 1941 and the capture of Guam shortly thereafter, American Samoa became of critical importance as the only major American base in the western Pacific, and it was further fortified in anticipation of attack.  Although no attack ever came, American Samoa was a critical supply and training point for American military actions in the Pacific.

See also
Breakers Point Naval Guns, across the harbor
List of United States National Historic Landmarks in United States commonwealths and territories, associated states, and foreign states
National Register of Historic Places listings in American Samoa
Naval Base Samoa

References

External links
Kennedy, Joseph. "Great Guns: Archaeologists uncover traces of a Pacific island’s wartime preparations." Natural History Magazine. Vol. 120 Issue 10. December 2012.

National Historic Landmarks in American Samoa
Pago Pago
Buildings and structures on the National Register of Historic Places in American Samoa
United States Marine Corps installations
Military installations closed in the 1940s
World War II on the National Register of Historic Places
1942 establishments in American Samoa